Ulakkonde is a village in Sri Lanka. It is located within Central Province.It is in the Udunuwara constiuancy most of the inhabitants are sinhalese it is from 12 kilometers from Kandy town

See also
List of towns in Central Province, Sri Lanka

External links

Populated places in Kandy District